was the mayor of Kawasaki, Kanagawa in Japan. He was first elected in 2001.

References 
 

Mayors of places in Kanagawa Prefecture
Japanese radio personalities
1943 births
Living people